Cladonia boryi , also commonly known as fishnet cladonia or fishnet lichen, is a species of lichen. It is distinctive in the genus Cladonia because the stalks (podetia) are very wide, seemingly hollow, and often perforated, hence the colloquial name - the fishnet lichen. It is also known as Bory's cup lichen.

Description
Podetia wider than most in Cladonia; the walls often being irregularly perforated. Podetia end in small coronets, tips of which are usually colored maroon.

Range
Mostly reported from North East United States of America GBIF, occasional records from other locations including Japan.

Habitat
Usually found on sand dunes, sand, or in forest glades.

Taxonomy
Originally described by Edward Tuckerman in 1847. Now classified in the section Unciales   Index Fungorum UUID: {5636B9BC-C79E-4041-87D6-3BC889939E0D}

References

boryi
Lichen species
Taxa named by Edward Tuckerman
Lichens described in 1847
Lichens of the Northeastern United States
Lichens of Canada
Fungi without expected TNC conservation status